"The Mexican" is a song by British rock band Babe Ruth, from their debut album First Base.

The song has been compiled, covered and mixed many times and is considered one of the most influential songs in hip hop music culture as well as being popular in early disco clubs such as The Loft.

The song was written by Alan Shacklock and recorded along with the rest of the First Base album at Abbey Road Studios in the summer of 1972. Shacklock wrote the lyrics of the song as a retort to the 1960 John Wayne film The Alamo, which was full of historical inaccuracies and did not show the human side of the Mexican troops who defeated the Texian forces at the Battle of the Alamo. The song has a driving drum beat and funky bass and shows Shacklock’s fondness for African-American music and Wild West shoot outs.

The song composition interpolates "Per qualche dollaro in più" by Ennio Morricone, from the soundtrack for the film For a Few Dollars More which was directed by Sergio Leone.

Personnel 
 Alan Shacklock – lead guitar
 Jenny Haan – lead vocals, castanets
 Dave Hewitt – bass guitar
 Dave Punshon – electric piano
 Dick Powell – drums

Cover versions 
 1978: Bombers, a Montreal disco group
 1984: Jellybean with vocals by the original singer, Jenny Haan.  This version went to number one on the US dance chart.
 1999: Helloween, released on Metal Jukebox
 2006: Marc Hype & Jim Dunloop feat. Sara Bourgeois
 2015: Gza, member of the hip-hop group Wu-Tang Clan
 2020: Stretch & Bobbito, The M19s Band feat. Mireya Ramos

References

External links
 discogs.com

1972 songs
1984 debut singles